"Freeek!" is a song written and performed by English singer George Michael. The song contains samples from "Try Again" by Aaliyah, "Breathe and Stop" by Q-Tip, and "N.T." by Kool & the Gang. A remastered version called "Freeek! '04" was later included on Michael's fifth and final studio album, Patience (2004).

The single was released on 18 March 2002; the first of six to come from Patience, although the album itself was not released until 2004. The song peaked at number seven on the UK Singles Chart and also charted within the top ten in many other European countries. It topped the charts of Denmark, Hungary, Italy, Portugal, and Spain and reached number five in Australia.

Music video
The music video for "Freeek!" was directed by Joseph Kahn. It incorporates a futuristic theme, including cyborgs and sophisticated technology recalling the film Blade Runner, with a sexually aggressive tone. The directorial effects in the video were first used in Janet Jackson's "Doesn't Really Matter" video, also directed by Kahn.

With a production budget of $2 million (equivalent to $2.59 million in 2018), the music video for "Freeek!" is the 20th most expensive music video made.

Track listings

UK and Australian CD1
 "Freeek!"
 "Freeek!" (The Scumfrogs mix)
 "Freeek!" (Moogymen mix)

UK and Australian CD2
 "Freeek!"
 "Freeek!" (Max Reich mix)
 "The Long and Winding Road" (Beatles cover)

UK cassette single and European CD single
 "Freeek!"
 "The Long and Winding Road" (Beatles cover)

Japanese CD single
 "Freeek!"
 "Freeek!" (The Scumfrogs mix)
 "Freeek!" (Moogymen mix)
 "Freeek!" (Max Reich mix)
 "The Long and Winding Road" (Beatles cover)

Charts and sales

Weekly charts

Year-end charts

Certifications and sales

Release history

See also
 List of number-one hits of 2002 (Italy)
 List of number-one singles of 2002 (Spain)
 List of number-one songs of the 2000s (Denmark)

References

2001 songs
2002 singles
Funk songs
George Michael songs
Music videos directed by Joseph Kahn
Number-one singles in Denmark
Number-one singles in Hungary
Number-one singles in Italy
Number-one singles in Portugal
Number-one singles in Spain
Polydor Records singles
Song recordings produced by George Michael
Songs about BDSM
Songs written by George Michael